The Conway Street drill hall is a former military installation in Brecon, Wales.

History
The building was designed as the headquarters of the 1st (Brecknockshire) Volunteer Battalion, South Wales Borderers and was completed in the early 20th century. This unit evolved to become the 1st (Brecknockshire) Battalion, The South Wales Borderers in 1908. The battalion was mobilised at the drill hall in August 1914 before being deployed to India. The battalion amalgamated with the 3rd Battalion, The Monmouthshire Regiment to form 
3rd (Brecknockshire and Monmouthshire) Battalion, The Monmouthshire Regiment at the Baker Street drill hall in Abergavenny in 1922. The drill hall was subsequently decommissioned and, although it has recently been substantially rebuilt, it continues to be used as an Army Cadet Force Centre.

References

 
Drill halls in Wales